The 2004 season was the Kansas City Chiefs' 35th in the National Football League (NFL), their 45th overall and their 42nd in Kansas City.

The 2004 season proved not to be as successful as the team's previous season. Though the Chiefs finished the regular season with the most yards and the second highest number of points, they also had a losing record of 7–9 and no playoff appearance. In fact, the Chiefs' 483 points-scored was the highest total in NFL history for a team that finished the season with a losing record. The Chiefs joined the 1975 Buffalo Bills as the only teams in NFL history to score an average of at least 30 points per game and miss the playoffs.

Offseason

NFL draft

Staff

Roster

Preseason

Regular season

Schedule

Note: Intra-division opponents are in bold text.

Game summaries

Week 1: at Denver Broncos

Week 2: vs. Carolina Panthers

Week 3: vs. Houston Texans

Week 4: at Baltimore Ravens

Week 6: at Jacksonville Jaguars

Week 7: vs. Atlanta Falcons

Week 8: vs. Indianapolis Colts

Week 9: at Tampa Bay Buccaneers

Week 10: at New Orleans Saints

Week 11: vs. New England Patriots

Week 12: vs. San Diego Chargers

Week 13: at Oakland Raiders

Week 14: at Tennessee Titans

Week 15: vs. Denver Broncos

Week 16: vs. Oakland Raiders

Week 17: at San Diego Chargers

Standings

References

Kansas City Chiefs
Kansas City Chiefs seasons
Kansas City Chiefs